The Combination routine competition of the synchronised swimming at the 2012 European Aquatics Championships was held on May 27.

Medalists

Results
The final was held at 19:00 on May 27.

References

2012 European Aquatics Championships